Hamilton Farmstead is a historic farm complex and national historic district located at Mexico in Oswego County, New York. The district includes three contributing structures; the farmhouse, a barn, and a milkhouse; and three hand-dug wells. The farmhouse is a three bay, two story cobblestone building built in 1848 in the Greek Revival style.

It was listed on the National Register of Historic Places in 1991.

References

Farms on the National Register of Historic Places in New York (state)
Historic districts on the National Register of Historic Places in New York (state)
Cobblestone architecture
Historic districts in Oswego County, New York
National Register of Historic Places in Oswego County, New York